Dwight Diller (born August 17, 1946, died 14 February 2023) was an American banjo and fiddle player and teacher.  He is considered to be one of the most prominent exponents of the clawhammer banjo tradition.

Diller lived in Hillsboro, West Virginia and now Marlinton, and is an inheritor of the old-time music tradition of the Hammons Family of West Virginia.  He has conducted banjo workshops around the United States and in England.  He has released a number of recordings and instructional videos.

External links
Dwight Diller official site
Dwight Diller interview from Banjo News (and Wayback)

American banjoists
Appalachian old-time fiddlers
Old-time musicians
1946 births
People from Pocahontas County, West Virginia
Living people
Place of birth missing (living people)
People from Hillsboro, West Virginia
21st-century violinists